Arkad Chubanov (1840–1894) was a Buddhist priest of Kalmyk origin who was born in the Ike Burul aimak in the Salsk District of the Don Cossack Host sometime in 1840.

Lama Chubanov was born in 1840 in the Namrovskaia sotnia of the Ike Burul aimak. He was the second son of Chuban Manzhikov. His uncle, Roman Manzhikov, was the Baksha of the khurul in his native aimak. Following his uncle's path, Arkad Chubanov became a mandji (novice) at the age of 9, serving until the age of 13 in 1853. He then furthered his studies of Buddhism under the guidance of Lama Djimba Gandjinov and then in the Bolshederbotovskii ulus under Lama Sandji Yavanov, the Ochir Lama.

After he completed his studies in 1872, Arkad Chubanov returned home to become a monk in his native khurul. He remained in that position until 1873, when he was elected to replace Koti Badjuginov as "Lama of the Don Kalmyks" - the spiritual leader of the Kalmyk community in the Salsk District of the Don Cossack Host.

Upon becoming the Lama of the Don Kalmyks, Arkad Chubanov promoted education among Buzava (or Don Kalmyk) youth. In his native Namrovskaia sotnia, for example, Arkad Chubanov established a parish school - the first official school for Buzava youth in the Salsk District and perhaps the first school for Kalmyk boys in general. Arkad Chubanov also compiled and published the Kalmyk lunar calendar.

Arkad Chubanov died in 1894 after serving 21 years as Lama of the Don Kalmyks. He was succeeded by Lama Djimba Mikulinov, the Baksha of the khurul in the Ike Burul aimak.

See also
Buddhism in Russia
Buddhism in Kalmykia
Dashi-Dorzho Itigilov

References
Bormanshinov, Arash. Lama Arkad Chubanov, His Predecessors and Successors, Birchbark Press, College Park, MD 1980.
Bormanshinov, Arash. THE LAMAS OF THE KALMYK PEOPLE: THE DON KALMYK LAMAS, Papers on Inner Asia, No. 18, Research Institute for Inner Asian Studies, Indiana University, Bloomington, 1991.

Tibetan Buddhist priests from Kalmykia
1840 births
1894 deaths
Buddhists from the Russian Empire